Samāʾil is a Wilayah (province) located in Ad-Dakhiliyah Region of the Sultanate of Oman.

Sama'il Valley

The valley or wadi of Sama'il, also referred to as the "Sumail Gap", divides Al Hajar Mountains into the Eastern and Western subranges. A route from the coast to the country's interior traverses the valley. The route ends at Izki, and acts as the main road from Muscat to Nizwa.

History

Masjid Māzin is considered to be the oldest mosque in the country. It was founded by Māzin bin Ghaḍūbah, who was considered to be the first Omani to adopt Islam during Muhammad's lifetime.

Historically, the route along the Sumail Gap was used for trade and communication between coastal and interior areas of Oman. Caravans had used this route for trading in frankincense, and its explorers include Marco Polo and Ibn Battutah.

Climate

Gallery

References

 
Populated places in Oman
Ad Dakhiliyah Governorate
Al Hajar Mountains